Mark Edmondson was the defending champion, but did not participate this year.

Mike Bauer won the title, defeating Chris Johnstone 4–6, 7–6, 6–2 in the final.

Seeds

  Hank Pfister (first round)
  John Alexander (first round)
  Tim Wilkison (first round)
  Pat Cash (semifinals)
  Mike De Palmer (quarterfinals)
  Rod Frawley (quarterfinals)
  Mike Estep (first round)
  Jeff Borowiak (second round)

Draw

Finals

Top half

Bottom half

External links
 1982 South Australian Open draw

Singles